Rumat sävelet (Finnish for "The Ugly Tunes") is the second album of Finnish rock band Hassisen Kone. It was a successful follow-up to the group's debut Täältä tullaan Venäjä, and was certified platinum in 2005.

Ismo Alanko has said that the album's lyrics partly reflected how he experienced the sudden success of their debut album. This is most evident in the song "Jurot nuorisojulkkikset" ("Surly Youth Celebrities").  Hassisen Kone played the song in 2000 at a reunion concert, even though Alanko thought it was strange singing the song as a 40-year-old.

In 2005 the critics of Soundi rock magazine chose the album to be the fifth greatest Finnish popular music album.

Track listing 
All tracks written by Ismo Alanko.
 "Oikeus on voittanut taas"—3:12
 "Führerin puolesta"—3:22
 "Jurot nuorisojulkkikset"—3:27
 "Uhrisavua"—3:15
 "Jeesus tulee"—2:30
 "Tuomiopäivä tulee"—4:32
 "Odotat?!"—3:15
 "Rajat"—4:15
 "Tällä tiellä"—3:14
 "Pelkurit"—2:28
 "Hyvä olla"—4:12

Personnel 
 Ismo Alanko -- vocals, guitar, keyboards, cello
 Reijo Heiskanen—guitar, backing vocals
 Jussi Kinnunen -- bass, backing vocals
 Harri Kinnunen -- drums

Notes 

1981 albums
Hassisen Kone albums